Moriguchi (written:  lit. "forest mouth") is a Japanese surname. Notable people with the surname include:

Denise Moriguchi (born 1976), American businesswoman
, Japanese businessman
, Japanese singer
, Japanese textile artist
, Japanese textile artist
, American businesswoman
, American businessman and activist
, Japanese actress
, Japanese golfer

See also
Tomoko Moriguchi-Matsuno (born 1945), American businesswoman

Japanese-language surnames